The  is a horse race held twice a year in Japan, once in the spring and once in the autumn.  "Tenno" means "Emperor of Japan".  The races are both International Grade I races.  Prior to the 2007 races, both Tenno Sho races were Japanese domestic Grade I races.

Spring

The Spring Tenno Sho is held at Kyoto Racecourse, in late April or early May.

Deep Impact won the 2006 version of the race setting the world record for a 3200 metre race with a time of 3:13.4. beating the World Record set in the 1988 Wellington Cup by Daria’s Fun, held for almost 20 years of 3:15.59, the closest time run in The Melbourne Cup is 3:16.3.  Deep Impact's record stood until Kitasan Black won in 3:12.5 in 2017.
The average time 1990-2018 of the Tenno Sho is 3:16.7, the Melbourne Cup 3:21.1, a difference of 4.4 seconds.

Winners since 1990

The 1994 race was contested at Hanshin Racecourse.
The 2021 and 2022 races were contested at Hanshin Racecourse, due to construction at Kyoto Racecourse.

Earlier winners

 1938 - Hase Park
 1939 - Sugenuma
 1940 - Toki no Chikara
 1941 - Marutake
 1942 - Minami Mor
 1943 - Grand Lite
 1944 - Hiro Sakura
 1945 - No race
 1946 - No race
 1947 - Olite
 1948 - Cyma
 1949 - Miharu O
 1950 - Owens
 1951 - Takakura Yama
 1952 - Mitsuhata
 1953 - Leda
 1954 - Hakuryou
 1955 - Taka O
 1956 - Meiji Hikari
 1957 - Kitano O
 1958 - Onward There
 1959 - Tosa O
 1960 - Kuripero
 1961 - Yamanin More
 1962 - Onslaught
 1963 - Korehisa
 1964 - Hikaru Pola
 1965 - Asahoko
 1966 - Hakuzuikou
 1967 - Speed Symboli
 1968 - Hikarutakai
 1969 - Takeshiba O
 1970 - Riki Eikan
 1971 - Mejiro Musashi
 1972 - Bell Wide
 1973 - Tai Tehm
 1974 - Take Hope
 1975 - Ichifuji Isami
 1976 - Erimo George
 1977 - Ten Point
 1978 - Green Grass
 1979 - Kashuu Chikara
 1980 - Nichidou Taro
 1981 - Katsura no Haiseiko
 1982 - Monte Prince
 1983 – Amber Shadai
 1984 – Monte Fast
 1985 - Symboli Rudolf
 1986 - Kushiro King
 1987 - Miho Shinzan
 1988 - Tamamo Cross
 1989 - Inari One

Autumn

The Autumn Tenno Sho is held at Tokyo Racecourse, in late October. It is considered the first leg of the Japanese Autumn Triple Crown (the other two are the Japan Cup and the Arima Kinen).

Winners since 1990

* Mejiro McQueen finished first in 1991 but was demoted to last place following a Stewards' Inquiry.@ The 2002 Autumn Tennō Shō was contested at Nakayama Racecourse, due to construction at Tokyo Racecourse.# Also Japanese record of flat racing for oldest horse winning first G1 race.

Earlier winners

 1937 – Happy Might
 1938 - Hisatomo
 1939 - Tetsumon
 1940 – Rocky Mor
 1941 - Estates
 1942 - Ni Patois
 1943 - Kuri Hikari
 1944 - No race
 1945 - No race
 1946 - No race
 1947 - Toyo Ume
 1948 - Katsu Fuji
 1949 - Newford
 1950 - Yashima Daughter
 1951 - Hatakaze
 1952 - Track O
 1953 - Queen Narubi
 1954 - Opal Orchid
 1955 - Dainana Hoshu
 1956 - Midfarm
 1957 - Hakuchikara
 1958 - Cellulose
 1959 - Garnet
 1960 - Ote Mon
 1961 - Takamagahara
 1962 - Kurihide
 1963 - Ryu Forel
 1964 - Yamato Kyodai
 1965 - Shinzan
 1966 - Korehide
 1967 - Kabuto Ciro
 1968 - Knit Eight
 1969 - Mejiro Taiyo
 1970 - Mejiro Asama
 1971 - Tomei
 1972 - Yamanin Wave
 1973 - Tani no Chikara
 1974 - Kami no Tesio
 1975 - Fujino Parthia
 1976 - Eyeful
 1977 - Hokuto Boy
 1978 - Tenmei
 1979 - Three Giants
 1980 - Pretty Cast
 1981 - Hoyo Boy
 1982 - Mejiro Titan
 1983 - Kyoei Promise
 1984 - Mr. C.B.
 1985 - Gallop Dyna
 1986 - Sakura Yutaka O
 1987 - Nippo Teio
 1988 - Tamamo Cross
 1989 - Super Creek

Multiple winners
Prior to 1980, a horse winning a Tennō Shō races was not allowed to participate in future editions of the race but this ban was lifted in 1981. Only two horses won the prize three times:
Kitasan Black (2016 Spring, 2017 Spring and Autumn)
T M Opera O (2000 Spring and Autumn, 2001 Spring)

Apart from Kitasan Black and T M Opera O, four horses to date have won consecutive runnings, either by winning both the Spring and Autumn races in the same year or by winning the Autumn race, and following year's Spring race.
Tamamo Cross (1988 Spring, Autumn)
Super Creek (1989 Autumn, 1990 Spring) 
Special Week (1999 Spring, Autumn)
Meisho Samson (2007 Spring and Autumn)

Five horses have won two non-consecutive runnings.
Mejiro McQueen (1991, 1992 Spring, finished 1st in 1991 Autumn but demoted to last)
Rice Shower (1993, 1995 Spring)
Symboli Kris S (2002, 2003 Autumn)
Fenomeno (2013, 2014 Spring)
Fierement (2019, 2020 Spring)
Almond Eye (2019, 2020 Autumn)

See also
 Horse racing in Japan
 List of Japanese flat horse races

References
Spring
Racing Post: 

Autumn
Racing Post: 

Turf races in Japan
Open middle distance horse races
Open long distance horse races